Stephanie Palmer is a consultant, development executive, and author. In 2005, she founded Good in a Room, a consulting company and blog that helps professionals inside and outside the film industry learn to pitch and advance their projects.

Early life
She grew up in Alexandria, Virginia and went to college at Carnegie Mellon University where she received a B.F.A in Theatre Directing.

Film industry
She started her career in the film industry as an unpaid intern on Titanic before becoming an assistant at Jerry Bruckheimer Films where she worked on Armageddon, Con Air, and Enemy of the State. From there, she moved to MGM where she became Director of Creative Affairs. In this position, she supervised the acquisition, development, and production of feature films including 21, Legally Blonde, Be Cool, The Brothers Grimm, Agent Cody Banks, Agent Cody Banks 2, A Guy Thing and Good Boy!

The Hollywood Reporter named her one of the top 35 executives under 35.

Good in a Room

Company
In 2005, she left MGM and launched Good in a Room, a consulting company where she helps professionals inside and outside the film industry learn to pitch and advance their projects.

She leads workshops and gives presentations for companies and organizations such as Google, William Morris Endeavor, Merrill Lynch, Disney, UCLA, University of Southern California, Warner Bros., National Speakers Association Graduate School, and the Great American Pitchfest.  She also is the moderator for the American Film Market's Annual Pitch Conference.

In 2013, she began offering an online webinar called "Pitching Essentials" which is aimed at helping TV writers, screenwriters, and filmmakers develop their pitching skills.

Book and blog
In 2008, she authored the book Good in a Room, published by Random House, which features several techniques for people who have to pitch or sell things, whether it be business plans, movie scripts, or themselves. These techniques break down the pitch into parts and explain how to progress through a meeting. 

In 2012, she launched the blog "Good in a Room."  In her blog, she shows effective pitches from the film, TV, advertising, and venture capital industries and provides tips to help creative professionals learn to pitch more successfully.

Media appearances
She has been featured on the Today Show on NBC, The Early Show on CBS, National Public Radio, Expert Access Radio, and in the Los Angeles Times, Variety,  The Hollywood Reporter, Inc., The Atlantic, Speaker, and Script magazines.

References

External links 
Stephanie Palmer website

Living people
American bloggers
American business writers
Women business writers
American self-help writers
Writers from Alexandria, Virginia
Carnegie Mellon University College of Fine Arts alumni
21st-century American non-fiction writers
American women bloggers
Year of birth missing (living people)
21st-century American women writers